Rocchi is a surname of Italian origin. Notable people with the surname include: 

 Carla Rocchi, Italian politician
 Claudio Rocchi, Italian rock singer-songwriter and radio host
 Ferrante Rocchi, Italian tennis player
 Fortunato Rocchi (1822–1909), Italian painter
 Francesco De Rocchi, Italian painter
 Fulvio Rocchi, Argentine sport shooter
 Gianluca Rocchi, Italian football referee
 Giordana Rocchi, Italian artistic gymnast
 Luigi Rocchi, Italian Roman Catholic, disabled for most of his life
 Jack Rocchi, Mexican footballer 
 Jean-Jacques Rocchi, French footballer 
 José Rocchi, Mexican footballer
 Linda Rocchi, Italian painter
 Romain Rocchi, French footballer 
 Sesto Rocchi, Italian violin maker
 Tommaso Rocchi, Italian footballer 
 Vincenzo Rocchi, Italian painter

Other
 Stadio Enrico Rocchi, multi-use stadium in Viterbo, Italy 

Italian-language surnames